Kuruvadipatti is a village in the Thanjavur taluk of Thanjavur district, Tamil Nadu, India. It is located 12 kilometres from Thanjavur town on the Thanjavur-Trichy highway.

Demographics 

As per the 2001 census, Kuruvadipatti had a total population of 873 with 414 males and  459 females. The sex ratio was 1109. The literacy rate was 67.81.

References 

 

Villages in Thanjavur district